The Di Rudinì II government of Italy held office from 10 March 1896 until 15 July 1896, a total of 127 days, or 4 months and 5 days.

Government parties
The government was composed by the following parties:

The cabinet was externally supported by the Historical Left.

Composition

References

Italian governments
1896 establishments in Italy